Makol or مکول is a village in Abbottabad District of Khyber Pakhtunkhwa province of Pakistan. The village Makol is divided into two parts. Makol Bala مکول بالا یا اپری مکول and Makol Payeen مکول پائیں‘ بنی مکول‘ ترلی مکول.
Makol Bala has three parts. Danna Makol ڈنہ مکول Makol Garan مکول گراں and Sadyalan ni Pandi صدیالاں نی پانڈی. Technically Chak Akhroota is also part of Makol Bala although locally its inhabitants belong to Makol Payeen and Tatreela. There are two primary schools. The major caste of Makool Tarli and Makool Bala is Karlal known as Sardar, Karlal (Sardar) tribes are the main stakeholder of Makool Tarli and Makool Bala. Besides, some other castes are also lived there such as Sadyal, Gujjar, Awan, etc. The local language of this region is Hindko and Potohar.

References

Populated places in Abbottabad District